This is a list of fellows of the Royal Society elected in 1984.

Fellows

John Alan Gulland  (1926–1990)
Denis Henry Desty  (1923–1994)
James Griffiths Howard  (1927–1998)
Frank Brian Mercer  (1927–1998)
Hans Henriksen Ussing  (1911–2000)
Edward Raymond Andrew  (1921–2001)
Gordon Lowe  (1933–2003)
William Parry  (1934–2006)
Pierre-Gilles de Gennes  (1932–2007)
Sir Gareth Gwyn Roberts  (1940–2007)
George Emil Palade  (d. 2008)
Robert Geoffrey Edwards  (1925–2013)
Obaid Siddiqi  (1932–2013)
Sir Michael John Berridge
Sir Tom Leon Blundell
Quentin Bone
Christopher Reuben Calladine
David Edgar Cartwright
Sir Philip Cohen
George Alan Martin Cross
Sir David Evan Naunton Davies
Richard Anthony Flavell
Sir Brian Keith Follett
Roald Hoffmann
Ernest Demetrios Hondros
John Henderson Knox
Sir John Richard Krebs
Ronald Alfred Laskey
Sir Alistair George James MacFarlane
Peter Michael Maitlis
Matthew Stanley Meselson
Takeshi Oka
Charles Barry Osmond
Sir John Brian Pendry
Richard Nelson Perham
Frank Henry Read
Carlo Rubbia
Ian Alexander Shanks
Sir John James Skehel
Frank Thomas Smith
Christopher Hubert Llewellyn Smith
Michael James Stowell
Keith Vickerman
David Williams
Michael Mark Woolfson
Peter John Wyllie

References

1984
1984 in science
1984 in the United Kingdom